Valentine is a historic neighborhood in Kansas City, Missouri. It is just north of the Westport entertainment district, bounded by Broadway on the east, Southwest Trafficway on the west, 31st Street on the north, and 40th Street on the south.

Most of the houses in Valentine were built in the early 1900s and include such styles as Shirtwaist, Arts and Crafts, Colonial Revival, Georgian Revival, and bungalow.

The Valentine Neighborhood Association was formed in 1971. The first president was Joe Cigas, for whom a street is named.

Buildings on the National Register of Historic Places that are located in Valentine 
 Ambassador Hotel Historic District - Listed February 17, 1983 (#83000995) 3600 Broadway
 Knickerbocker Apartments - Listed June 13, 2003 (#03000525) 501-535 Knickerbocker Place
 Norman School - Listed January 15, 2014 (#13001087) 3514 Jefferson St.
 Uptown Building and Theatre - Listed June 27, 1979 (#79001374) 3700-3712 Broadway
 Valentine on Broadway Hotel - Listed August 1, 2008 (#08000745) 3724 Broadway

See also 
 List of neighborhoods in Kansas City, Missouri
 Knickerbocker Apartments (Kansas City, Missouri)
 Uptown Theater (Kansas City, Missouri)
 Penn Valley Redevelopment Project

External links 
 Valentine Neighborhood Association
 Midtown KC Post
 Kansas City, MO

Gallery

References

Neighborhoods in Kansas City, Missouri